Sagi Haviv (born 1974 in Israel) is an Israeli-American graphic designer and a partner in the design firm Chermayeff & Geismar & Haviv. Called a "logo prodigy" by The New Yorker, and a "wunderkind" by Out magazine, he is best known for having designed the trademarks and visual identities for brands and institutions such as Discovery, Inc.'s online streaming service Discovery+, the United States Olympic & Paralympic Museum, the US Open tennis tournament, Conservation International, Harvard University Press, and L.A. Reid's Hitco Entertainment, and tech and electric car company Togg.

Biography
Haviv was born in Nachshonim, Israel, where he spent his early life. He studied at the Telma Yelin art high school in Givataim. In 1996, Haviv moved to New York. He studied graphic design at The Cooper Union School of Art where he earned a Bachelor of Fine Arts.

Haviv began his design career when he joined Chermayeff & Geismar in 2003. There he created "Logomotion", an award-winning ten-minute motion graphics tribute to the firm’s famous trademarks which was widely exhibited, appearing in New York at Corcoran Gallery of Art (2003), in Washington, D.C. (2004), the Ginza Graphic Gallery in Tokyo (2005), Centro in Mexico City (2006), and the Pera Museum Istanbul (2007).

In 2006 he became a partner at Chermayeff & Geismar, where he has since developed institutional and corporate identities, print and motion graphics and art in architecture for a diverse array of clients worldwide. Haviv’s motion graphics work includes the main titles for the PBS documentary series Carrier, and the 2010 PBS documentary series Circus, and a typographic animation for the centerpiece performance at Alicia Keys’s Black Ball, 2009 for Keep A Child Alive.

In 2013 Haviv's name was added to the masthead of the 56 year old firm Chermayeff & Geismar and it became known as Chermayeff & Geismar & Haviv.

Published books 
In 2011, he co-authored with Tom Geismar and Ivan Chermayeff the book Identify: Basic Principles of Identity Design in the Iconic Trademarks of Chermayeff & Geismar. The book was published by Print magazine's book imprint,.

In 2018, he co-authored Identity: Chermayeff & Geismar & Haviv. The book was published by Standards Manual.

Conferences and awards chairing

Haviv has spoken about logo design for the Adobe Max Creativity Conference TEDx, the AIGA, the HOW Design Conference, the Brand New Conference, Princeton University, the Onassis Foundation, the American Advertising Federation, Columbia Business School, Creative Mornings, and Collision.

He has served as jury chair for the Clio Awards and the Art Directors Club and Jury President for the D&AD Awards.

Teaching
He teaches corporate identity design at The School of Visual Arts in New York City.

He has also taught online courses on logo design for SkillShare and for Domestika.

Published articles
Haviv has written on the topic of identity design for Creative Review, Domestika,Print magazine, Computer Arts, and for D&AD

Awards 
In 2004, Haviv received the Tokyo Type Directors Club award for Logomotion, for which he also won an award from the New York Art Directors Club.

Logos designed

Further reading
Warner Bros. Discovery Gets a Modern New Logo in Fast Co. Design
Chermayeff & Geismar & Haviv’s striped logo for the US Olympic and Paralympic Museum takes the form of an “abstract flame” on ItsNiceThat.com
How Sagi Haviv collaborates to build iconic brands on Wix's Shaping Design
How to Create a Logo That Lasts on Creative Review
Clio Awards interview with Sagi Haviv
Heller, Steven. I Heart Design (2011) Massachusetts: Rockport,  
How To Design A Logo by Sagi Haviv in Bloomberg Businessweek How To Issue, 2012
What A Campaign Logo Is Really Saying in Bloomberg Politics
Campaign Logos in Review, NBC
US Open Tennis rebrand review on DesignBoom
A Conversation with Sagi Haviv on Graphic Design USA
Interview with Haviv on Bloomberg Businessweek
Excerpt of Identify in Fast Co. Design
Interview with The Futur
Interview with the Art Director's Club
Interview With Sagi Haviv on Logo Design Love
The Best And Worst 2016 Campaign Logos, Bloomberg Politics
Haviv profile on Designers & Books
Interview With Sagi Haviv on the Logo Geek Podcast

References

External links 
Chermayeff & Geismar & Haviv Official site

Israeli graphic designers
Art educators
Israeli poster artists
1974 births
Living people
Cooper Union alumni